John William "Zero" Drake (March 27, 1916 – March 26, 1973) was an American football player. He was the first round pick (10th overall) by the Cleveland Rams, their first ever draft pick, in the 1937 NFL Draft.  A Purdue Boilermakers running back, he led the NFL in touchdowns in the 1939 & 1940 seasons.

External links
 Biography of Johnny Drake - by Professional Football Researchers Association

1916 births
1973 deaths
American football fullbacks
Purdue Boilermakers football players
Cleveland Rams players
Players of American football from Chicago